The Parliament of Aruba is the unicameral legislature or parliament of Aruba. The parliament has 21 members, elected for a four-year term by proportional representation. Each member holds their seats until the parliament is dissolved, which is every four years by a general election. The leader of the party which gains a majority of seats usually becomes the Prime Minister.

Results of most recent election

2021 
The most recent elections were held on 25 June 2021, and resulted in a coalition government between the People's Electoral Movement (MEP) and RAIZ.

Parliament building

In 1975, the parliament building was opened for the Island Council of Aruba. The council did not have its own building, and had been renting locations in Oranjestad for almost 25 years. The building was officially called "Edificio di parlemento di Aruba". In 1 January 1986, the Status aparte was granted to Aruba making it a constituent country within the Kingdom of the Netherlands. The Parliament of Aruba became the successor of the Island Council. 

In 2011, construction started on a large extension of the Parliament Building.

See also
List of presidents of the Estates of Aruba

References

Government of Aruba
Aruba
Aruba
1986 establishments in Aruba